Emamabad may refer to:
Emamabad, Bushehr
Emamabad, Armand, Chaharmahal and Bakhtiari Province
Emamabad, Falard, Chaharmahal and Bakhtiari Province
Emamabad, Sardasht, Chaharmahal and Bakhtiari Province
Emamabad, Golestan
Emamabad, Bashagard, Hormozgan Province
Emamabad, Minab, Hormozgan Province
Emamabad, Kohgiluyeh and Boyer-Ahmad
Emamabad, Lorestan
Emamabad, Markazi
Emamabad, Semnan